Larry Wagner (September 15, 1907 – April 3, 2002) was an American arranger, composer, and bandleader.  He worked for the band of Paul Whiteman and was long associated with Glen Gray and the Casa Loma Orchestra.  His compositions "Whistler's Mother-in-Law", "No Name Jive" and "Turn Back the Hands of Time" became nationally popular.

Early life and career
Larry Wagner was born in Ashland, Oregon, on September 15, 1907.  He graduated from Ashland High School in 1926, and went on to attend the University of Oregon, majoring in journalism.  He dropped out of college in 1930 to play trumpet in the West Coast territory band of Johnny Robinson at Jantzen Beach Amusement Park.  He moved with the band to Seattle during their tenure at the Olympic Hotel.  During this time he took a correspondence course in musical arrangement offered by Archie Bleyer.  He moved to New York and existed in subsidence mode as a freelance arranger, including work for Cass Daley, George Hall, and the publishing company of Clarence Williams.  While in New York he befriended Bleyer on a personal basis; Bleyer helped him land a job arranging for Paul Whiteman's vocalist Durelle Alexander.

Success
Wagner joined Whiteman's outfit permanently in 1936, but left as an employee in November of that year.  When Whiteman needed a composition he could use for a theme-song in response to the ASCAP boycott, Murray McEachern brought Wagner's composition "Whistler's Mother-in-Law" to him as a possibility.  The song greatly pleased Whiteman, who wanted to record it but did not have a recording contract at the time.  Before Whiteman could record it, the song was published; a Bing Crosby and Muriel Lane duet took it to #9 on the charts and several other bands made recordings.  This led to a permanent souring in Whitemans's and Wagner's relationship.

Very late in 1937, Wagner led his own band under the moniker of "Larry Wagner and his Rhythmasters", which recorded and released three sides for Victor Records.

Wagner was a member of Glen Gray's Casa Loma Orchestra, doing arranging and composing for the band between the years 1938 and 1942.  "No Name Jive", which was a hit (#9) for Gray and his orchestra, was written by Wagner and in 1954, he recorded the song for A440 Records as the leader of a studio orchestra.

Wagner served in the United States Marine Corps during World War II and was part of an entertainment unit serving in the Pacific Theater.  An ASCAP member, he wrote "The Men of Iwo Jima" for the Corps.

Post-war
Following his military service, Wagner re-joined the Casa Loma Orchestra as arranger, and continued studies at the Schillinger School, which he credited with furthering his abilities as an arranger.  The Casa Loma outfit disbanded around 1950, leaving Wagner to pursue other projects, such as writing musicals intended for high-school performance, fronting a studio band featuring Billy Butterfield for A440 Records, forming a touring band, and recording with his band in 1956 for Forest Records in a favorably-reviewed single.  During this time Wagner had another hit song with his composition Turn Back the Hands of Time which Eddie Fisher took to #8 on the charts.  He continued his association with Glen Grey into the 1960s and helped perpetuate the Casa Loma leader's name after his death.

Family
Wagner married Elizabeth "Betty" Brown, his high-school sweetheart, in 1931; they had a daughter, Linda.  At his death, he was survived by his daughter, two grandchildren, and two great-grandchildren.

Compositions

Billy and I
Flamenco Love
Hearts Without Flowers
In the Dark of the Moon
A Lover's Lullaby
No Name Jive
One to Remember
Over the Rhythm of Raindrops
The Sound of America
Speak Well of Me
Turn Back the Hands of Time
Two Dukes on a Pier
Whistler's Mother-in-Law
You'll Never Be Lonely
 “I Looked Back” />

References

Musicians from Ashland, Oregon
1907 births
2002 deaths
Musicians from Oregon
United States Marine Corps personnel of World War II
United States Marines
University of Oregon alumni
People from Roslyn Heights, New York
20th-century American musicians
Victor Records artists
Casa Loma Orchestra members
Ashland High School (Oregon) alumni